Oakpark is an unincorporated community and U.S. post office located in Madison County, Virginia.

References

External links

Unincorporated communities in Virginia
Unincorporated communities in Madison County, Virginia